The Sveti Rok Tunnel is a road tunnel in Lika, Croatia. The tunnel runs between the Sveti Rok and Rovanjska exits on the A1 highway (Zagreb–Dubrovnik); eponymous villages are located near the tunnel's northbound and southbound entrances respectively.

Description
The northern portal of the tunnel is located at 561 meters above sea level, while the southern portal is located at 510 meters. The eastern tunnel is slightly longer than the western ( vs ).

The tunnel features an autonomous drainage system channeling water accumulating due to tunnel cleaning, as well as any seeping water, firefighting and accidents. The tunnel is equipped with variable traffic signs in order to ensure enhanced traffic safety of the traffic, regulated from traffic control centres along the A1 motorway. Electronic equipment allows use of two VHF radio frequencies (HR1 at 95.1 MHz and HR2 at 98.1 MHz) as well as cell phones. Electrical power is supplied to the tunnel via one 35 kV switching station at each end of the tunnel and 8 distribution switching stations in the tunnel itself. A backup electrical power supply is also provided to ensure continuous operation of the tunnel.

The tunnel was excavated using the New Austrian Tunnelling method, by means of drilling and explosive blasting. Some of the structures are of considerable length, as they appear to be connected to the surface – as indicated by the presence of bats. The speleological structures encountered during construction presented technical problems, but they have been successfully preserved as natural phenomena.

Traffic volume
Traffic is regularly counted and reported by Hrvatske autoceste, operator of the tunnel and the A1 motorway where the tunnel is located, and published by Hrvatske ceste, the Croatian roads agency. Substantial variations between annual (AADT) and summer (ASDT) traffic volumes are attributed to the fact that the tunnel carries substantial tourist traffic to the Dalmatian Adriatic resorts. The traffic count is performed using analysis of motorway tolls.

See also 
 Mala Kapela Tunnel

References

External links

 
 

Road tunnels in Croatia
Buildings and structures in Lika-Senj County
Buildings and structures in Zadar County
Tunnels completed in 2003
Transport in Zadar County